Aline may refer to:

Aline (given name), a feminine given name

Places
Aline, Idaho, United States, first settlement of the Latter-day Saints movement, now a ghost town
Aline, Oklahoma, United States, a town
Loch Aline, Scotland
266 Aline, a main belt asteroid

Music and film
Aline (band), French musical pop rock group, formerly Young Michelin
"Aline" (song), a 1965 song by Christophe
Aline (film), a 2021 French Canadian drama film about Céline Dion

In business
ALINE Systems, a maker of engineered footbeds and alignment measuring systems

See also
A-line (disambiguation)